Joe Blythe (1881–?) was an English footballer who played as a half-back for Blyth Spartans, Jarrow, Everton, West Ham United, Millwall
and Watford.

Footballing career
Born in Berwick-upon-Tweed, England, Blythe played for Blyth Spartans, Jarrow and Everton before moving to West Ham in 1902 and making his debut against Reading on 6 September 1902. Blythe missed only one game in his first season and played 23 games in  his second and final season with The Hammers. He joined Millwall for the following season and won the London Challenge Cup with them in 1909. He made 341 appearances for Millwall before moving to Watford for the 1911-12 season.

Managerial career
Blythe was manager of Blyth Spartans before the First World War.

References

1881 births
English footballers
Association football defenders
Everton F.C. players
Millwall F.C. players
West Ham United F.C. players
Blyth Spartans A.F.C. players
Watford F.C. players
English Football League players
English football managers
People from Berwick-upon-Tweed
Footballers from Northumberland
Date of birth unknown
Date of death unknown
Place of death unknown
Blyth Spartans A.F.C. managers
Jarrow F.C. players